Bernard Kaanjuka is a former manager of the Namibia national football team, a role he held on an interim basis from September 2011 until resigning in March 2013.

References

Date of birth missing (living people)
Living people
Namibian football managers
Namibia national football team managers
Year of birth missing (living people)